John Wesley "Jock" Somerlott (October 26, 1882 – April 21, 1965) was an American first baseman in Major League Baseball who played for the Washington Senators from 1910 to 1911. In 29 career games, he batted .204, scored eight runs, and had four stolen bases.

Personal life
John Wesley Somerlott was born in Flint, Indiana, to Jonas C.J. and Elmira (née Mabie) Somerlott, in 1882. He married Bertha Louisa Williams, and they were married at the parsonage of the church of Christ in Metz by the Rev. F. D. Durham on October 18, 1906, and lived most of their lives together in Steuben County, Indiana. For a time after their marriage the Somerlotts lived in Garrett, Indiana, where he was employed as a fireman on the Baltimore and Ohio Railroad, from which he retired in 1912. He divided his time between baseball and farming until 1937, when the family moved to Bronson, Michigan, where he engaged in business until his retirement in 1947. The Somerlotts moved to Fort Wayne, Indiana, and then California, returning to Steuben County in 1951 until the death of Bertha in 1960, and finally moving to DeKalb county before John died. The couple had one son, John Francis "Jock" on September 1, 1908, in Metz, Steuben County, Indiana.

Career
John Somerlott, or "Jock", as he was familiarly called by the old timers, was in professional baseball in Winnipeg, Manitoba, in the Southern Cooper County League. Somerlott went into the major league in the summer of 1910, with the Washington Nationals (now the Washington Senators), where he played for nearly a year, until he came back to Indiana late in 1911, taking over the Terre Haute ball club as playing manager, presumably he retired from baseball after the season of 1914, when he bought a farm in Steuben County. However, the baseball urge remained, and when Angola was in its heyday in baseball, and in the days when Charlie Gehringer was "farmed out" to Angola by the Detroit Tigers, John became the player-manager for the high-rating Angola team.

Professional career statistics

References
 Personal information from an October 10, 1956 50th Anniversary write up in The Steuban Republican

External links

 

1882 births
1965 deaths
Baseball players from Indiana
Major League Baseball first basemen
Washington Senators (1901–1960) players
Winnipeg Maroons (baseball) players
Tecumseh (minor league baseball) players
Terre Haute Hottentots players
Terre Haute Stags players
Terre Haute Miners players
Evansville Yankees players
Troy Trojans (minor league) players
Pittsfield Electrics players
People from Steuben County, Indiana
People from Branch County, Michigan